St Mary de Castro is an ancient, Grade I listed church in Leicester, England, located within the former bailey of Leicester Castle. Today it acts as a parish church in the Church of England's diocese of Leicester. "St Mary de Castro" is Latin for "St Mary of the Castle"; a name chosen to differentiate from nearby "St Mary de Pratis": "St. Mary of the Meadows".

The building was closed in 2011 to the public after the spire was found to be unsafe but as of April 2015 is open again. The spire has been demolished, and funds are currently insufficient to replace it and repair the tower beneath.

It is believed to have been the first church in the UK to be viewable online using Google Street View, having been photographed in August 2012.

Architectural history
It dates its founding to 1107 after Henry I of England granted the lands and castle to Robert de Beaumont, although the chronicler Henry Knighton implies that an Anglo-Saxon college of St Mary had existed and Robert merely refurbished it. Robert established it within the castle bailey as a college served by a Dean and 12 Canons (that is, a collegiate church) in honour of the Virgin Mary and All Souls and as a chantry chapel for the souls of him, his family and the first three Norman kings. He endowed this and four other churches with £6 of his income and land in or near the city. However, in 1143 these endowments were all transferred by his son Robert le Bossu, 2nd Earl of Leicester, to his own new Augustinian foundation of Leicester Abbey. The collegiate church retained, or had restored to it a dean, six clerks and a chaplain, along with Robert de Beaumont's grant of 20 shillings for lamps. It also retained parish offerings and most of the tithes. The collegiate nature of the church lasted until the college was disbanded in 1548 under the Chantry Act of Edward VI.

The early-12th-century church had no aisles, and various parts of these walls survive. It underwent a major expansion in the 1160, with a north aisle, doorways to north and west, and an extension to the chancel. The two doorways provide striking external Norman zigzag decoration, but it is the Sedilia and Piscina in the Chancel extension that Pevsner describes as "the finest piece of Norman decoration in the county". Thirteenth-century alterations culminated in a major reworking of transepts and south aisle, to create an aisle wider than the nave, providing much more space for local parishioners. Also the huge east window of the south aisle, with ingenious tracery, was created around 1300. The tower was built inside the south aisle, apparently as an afterthought, rising to a quatrefoil frieze, four decorated pinnacles, and the needlelike spire rising from the battlements. The spire was completely rebuilt in 1783, but retained its crockets and three tiers of lucarnes. The interior was worked on by George Gilbert Scott throughout the 1860s.

Spire
The church was closed when the spire was found to be unsafe. The 14th-century octagonal spire, having been rebuilt in 1783, had developed six-metre-long cracks in four of its faces in September 2013. After inspections by structural engineers, it was deemed at risk of collapse. The severe condition of the spire meant it had to be demolished, at an estimated cost of £200,000, in 2014. Over £358,000 has been raised since 2011; however, there are currently insufficient funds to rebuild the spire and repair the tower.

Famous events
It is rumoured that here, around 1366, Geoffrey Chaucer married Philippa (de) Roet (a lady-in-waiting to Edward III's queen, Philippa of Hainault, and a sister of Katherine Swynford who later ( 1396) became the third wife of Chaucer's friend and patron, John of Gaunt).

The infant king Henry VI was knighted in the church at Whitsuntide 1426 by his uncle, John of Lancaster, Duke of Bedford, the Regent of France (whilst the Parliament of Bats was being held at the Castle). Henry then proceeded to himself dub a further 44 knights on the same occasion, the first of whom was Richard Plantagenet, 3rd Duke of York.

William Bickerstaffe, a charitable local schoolmaster and antiquarian, was baptised, buried and held a seven-year curacy at the church.

Burials
Mary de Bohun, first wife of the future King Henry IV; died in childbirth

Organ
The church contains a three manual pipe organ which was originally installed in 1860 by Forster and Andrews. It has been the subject of modifications and restorations in 1880 by Joshua Porritt, and R. J. Winn in 1960. A specification of the organ can be found on the National Pipe Organ Register.

Organists
Henry Bramley Ellis organist 1878–1910
Benjamin Burrows 1910–?
William Snow, father of C. P. Snow 1930 – c. 1950
John M. Bence

See also
Anglican churches in Leicester
Grade I listed buildings in Leicester

References

External links

Parish website
Google Streetview Insideview of St Mary de Castro

12th-century church buildings in England
History of Leicester
Grade I listed churches in Leicestershire
Church of England church buildings in Leicester
Burial sites of the Bohun family
Anglo-Catholic church buildings in Leicestershire
Anglo-Catholic churches in England receiving AEO